Andrew Jeffrey Nielsen (born November 13, 1996) is a Canadian professional ice hockey defenceman who is currently playing for the Wilkes-Barre/Scranton Penguins in the American Hockey League (AHL). Nielsen was selected by the Toronto Maple Leafs in the third round, 65th overall, in the 2015 NHL Entry Draft.

Playing career
Nielsen started playing with the Lethbridge Hurricanes of the Western Hockey League (WHL) near the end of the 2013–14 season. On November 24, 2015, Nielsen was signed to a three-year entry-level contract with the Toronto Maple Leafs.

During the 2018–19 season, on November 27, 2018, Nielsen was traded by the Maple Leafs to the Calgary Flames in exchange for Morgan Klimchuk.

After five season and 226 regular season games in the AHL with the Toronto Marlies and Stockton Heat, Nielsen as an impending restricted free agent from the Calgary Flames, embarked on his first professional venture abroad in agreeing to a one-year deal with Austrian club, Black Wings 1992 of the ICE Hockey League, on August 27, 2020. Nielsen made 15 appearances for the Black Wings, posting 1 goal and 3 points before opting to return to North America.

Nielsen returned to the AHL, initially joining the Tucson Roadrunners training camp for the pandemic delayed 2020–21 season. Remaining on the roster to open the season, Nielsen was later released without featuring for the Roadrunners. On March 5, 2021, Nielsen was signed to a PTO with the Hershey Bears, affiliate to the Washington Capitals. He featured in 6 games with the Bears going scoreless to end the season.

As a free agent over the summer, Nielsen opted to continue in the AHL as a free agent, securing a one-year contract with the Colorado Eagles on September 16, 2021. After attending the Eagles training camp, Nielsen was assigned to ECHL affiliate, the Utah Grizzlies, to begin the 2021–22 season. Nielsen established himself on the top pairing with the Grizzlies, finding an offensive touch in recording 8 goals and 27 points through 36 games. Unable to feature in a game with the Eagles, Nielsen was released from his AHL contract with Colorado and was later signed to a professional try-out deal with the Ontario Reign on February 12, 2022. Nielsen was later released from Ontario's roster without featuring for the club and joined his third AHL club, the Tucson Roadrunners on a PTO, on February 23, 2022. He continued with the Roadrunners for the remainder of the season, adding 6 points through 16 games.

On October 9, 2022, Nielsen as a free agent opted to return with the Utah Grizzlies of the ECHL, signing a one-year contract for the 2022–23 season. While leading the Grizzlies in scoring with 18 points through 15 games, Nielsen was signed to a PTO with the San Diego Gulls on November 29, 2022. He made his Gulls debut against the Colorado Eagles on November 30, 2022, before he was released from his PTO and returned to the Grizzlies on December 2, 2022.

Career statistics

Awards and honours

References

External links
 

1996 births
Living people
Canadian ice hockey defencemen
EHC Black Wings Linz players
Hershey Bears players
Ice hockey people from Alberta
Lethbridge Hurricanes players
San Diego Gulls (AHL) players
Sportspeople from Red Deer, Alberta
Stockton Heat players
Toronto Maple Leafs draft picks
Toronto Marlies players
Tucson Roadrunners players
Utah Grizzlies (ECHL) players
Wilkes-Barre/Scranton Penguins players